Unhitched (previously known as The Rules for Starting Over) is an American sitcom that aired as a mid-season replacement on Fox from March 2 to 30, 2008. The series was originally scheduled to premiere at 9:30 p.m. ET, but aired 30 minutes later due to the runover of NASCAR. The show was created by Kevin Barnett, Mike Bernier and Chris Pappas. Bobby Farrelly, Peter Farrelly and Mike Sikowitz served as executive producers alongside Brad Johnson and Bradley Thomas, with Katy McCaffrey producing. The pilot was directed by Bobby and Peter Farrelly. The show revolved around a group of newly single friends learning the lessons of starting over in their 30s.

Produced by 20th Century Fox Television, Conundrum Entertainment and Watson Pond Productions, the series was greenlit and given a six-episode order on May 11, 2007. The pilot aired on Foxtel in Australia in 2008, one day after its original airdate in the United States, and on Network Ten later in the year.  It aired on FX in the United Kingdom. It also aired on TV6 in Sweden. The theme song for the show is a song called "Hey!" by the band Gillmor, and can be found on their Counting the Days album.

On May 5, 2008, Fox cancelled the series after one season.

Plot summary
From the creatively fruitful minds of the Farrelly Brothers comes a single camera comedy, set in Boston, about a group of newly single friends learning the painful lessons of starting over in their 30s. They'd all love to get married and remarried, if they could just find their true loves. Jack "Gator" Gately is a charismatic, optimistic leader who never expected to be single again. But now that he is, he's determined to make the best of it. He's going to sift through all the bruised, damaged, occasionally psychotic fruit until he finds "the one." Joining Gator in bachelorhood redux is his party animal best friend Tommy. The founder and brewmaster of an upstart microbrewery, Tommy has a voracious appetite for food, beer and women. He falls in love easily and always disastrously, yet truly hopes his new love will be "the one." Dr. Freddy Sahgal has seen some pretty strange stuff during his years as a successful surgeon, but he's never seen any of it through the eyes of a single man. Probably the least equipped of the group to handle this unexpected life change is Dr. Freddy, who can execute a triple bypass in his sleep, but is all thumbs when it comes to the opposite sex. Rounding out the group is Kate, a smart, successful attorney who handled Gator and Freddy's divorces. Having just turned 30, Kate finds herself dumped after a seven-year engagement. She reluctantly joins the guys in negotiating the treacherous waters of dating. Kate owns the brownstone next to Gator's. Over time, this pair may find that "the one" is just a brick wall away.

Cast
 Craig Bierko as Jack "Gator" Gately
 Rashida Jones as Kate Frankola
 Shaun Majumder as Dr. Freddy Sahgal
 Johnny Sneed as Tommy Leegan

Episodes

U.S. Nielsen ratings
In the following summary, "rating" is the percentage of all households with televisions that tuned to the show, and "share" is the percentage of all televisions in use at that time that are tuned in. "18-49" is the percentage of all adults aged 18–49 tuned into the show. "Viewers" are the number of viewers, in million, watching at the time. "Rank" how well the show did compared to other TV shows aired that week.

+ The premiere episode aired at 10pm due to a late-ending NASCAR race.

References

External links
 

2008 American television series debuts
2008 American television series endings
2000s American single-camera sitcoms
English-language television shows
Fox Broadcasting Company original programming
Television series by 20th Century Fox Television
Television shows set in Massachusetts